David Bell (born June 20, 1981) is an American professional basketball player who last played for Phoenix Brussels. Formerly, Bell played college basketball for the Montana Grizzlies basketball team and is playing professional since 2004. He has also played for multiple teams in the United States and in Europe.

Professional career
In September 2010, Bell signed with Phoenix Hagen of the German Basketball Bundesliga.

In June 2011, Bell signed a 2-year contract with GasTerra Flames Groningen of the Dutch DBL. On May 28, 2012, his contract was terminated by the club.

On June 21, 2012, Phoenix Hagen announced that Bell was returning to the team for a second stint. In April 2015, he extended his contract until 2017. In December 2016, Phoenix Hagen was thrown out of the BBL because of financial troubles and Bell became a free agent.

On December 8, 2016, Bell signed with Dinamo Sassari of the Italian LBA. On December 10, in his debut with the team Bell scored 18 points in a 69–66 win against Dolomiti Energia Trentino.

On August 2, 2017, Bell signed with Andrea Costa Imola.

On August 23, 2018, Bell was announced by the Gießen 46ers of the German BBL. In August 2018, it was announced Bell had a crack in his chest muscles, which would cause him to miss up to 4 months.

The Basketball Tournament (TBT) (2017–present) 
In the summer of 2017, Bell played in The Basketball Tournament on ESPN for Team 23.  He competed for the $2 million prize, and for Team 23, he averaged 18.0 points per game.  Bell helped Team 23 the second round of the tournament, where they then lost to Armored Athlete 84–77.

Honours
Dakota Wizards
NBA D-League Central Division: 2008

References

External links
 David Bell at legabasket.it
 

1981 births
Living people
American expatriate basketball people in Belgium
American expatriate basketball people in Finland
American expatriate basketball people in France
American expatriate basketball people in Germany
American expatriate basketball people in Italy
American expatriate basketball people in the Netherlands
American expatriate basketball people in Switzerland
American men's basketball players
Andrea Costa Imola players
Basketball players from Nebraska
Basketball players from Oakland, California
Brussels Basketball players
Champagne Châlons-Reims Basket players
Dakota Wizards players
Dinamo Sassari players
Donar (basketball club) players
Dutch Basketball League players
Giessen 46ers players
Junior college men's basketball players in the United States
Kouvot players
Montana Grizzlies basketball players
Phoenix Hagen players
Point guards
Union Neuchâtel Basket players